Kade Ruotolo (born January 22, 2003) is an American submission grappler and black belt Brazilian jiu-jitsu athlete.
A competitor with his twin brother Tye since the age of 3, Ruotolo is a IBJJF World champion, Pan Am and European Open champion at coloured belt level. Promoted to black belt in December 2021, Ruotolo won the 2022 ADCC World Championship in the 77kg division, becoming at age 19 the youngest-ever ADCC Submission Fighting World champion. Ruotolo is signed to ONE Championship where he is the current lightweight submission grappling champion.

Biography 
Born in Maui, Hawaii, of Italian and Puerto Rican heritage, Ruotolo was raised in Huntington Beach, California, and began competing in jiujitsu at age 3. Ruotolo and his twin brother Tye were considered "grappling's first child-stars". They trained at the Art Of Jiu-Jitsu academy (AOJ) for 4 years under Guilherme and Rafael Mendes before switching to Atos Jiu-Jitsu in 2017, a team to which AOJ was affiliated. Both Kade and his brother Tye were promoted to brown belts in BJJ by André Galvão in October 2020. Ruotolo and his brother were promoted to black belt on December 14, 2021, by André Galvão.

On November 29, 2020, Ruotolo competed at the Combat Jiu-Jitsu Lightweight World Championships and defeated four grapplers in one night to claim the title. His Buggy choke submission finish of PJ Barch in the final match was awarded 'Submission of the Year' at the Jitsmagazine 2020 BJJ Awards.

Ruotolo then won the 77kg division of the ADCC North American East Coast Trials on November 6, 2021, to claim an invite to the 2022 ADCC World Championship. He was later awarded with 'Submission of the Year' at the Jitsmagazine 2021 BJJ Awards for his flying d'arce choke finish of Joshua Dawson in the second round of the tournament. In preparation for the event, Ruotolo competed against Roberto Jimenez at Road to ADCC on July 17, 2021, and was submitted with a rear-naked choke. Across the weekend of September 25–26, Ruotolo competed at the Who's Number One Championships and defeated three opponents to become the promotion's inaugural Lightweight champion. At Grapplefest 10 on November 10, 2021, Ruotolo defeated Keith Krikorian by decision

On March 25, 2021, Ruotolo and his brother both signed a contract with ONE Championship to compete in submission grappling and eventually make their MMA debut. In his debut match at ONE 157, Ruotolo fought Shinya Aoki and won a unanimous decision.

Competing in the  division at the 2022 ADCC World Championship, an event commonly referred to as the "Olympics of grappling", Ruotolo became the youngest competitor to win gold, submitting Micael Galvão in the final, the first grappler to do so in competition.

On October 21, 2022, Ruotolo faced multiple-time Sambo World Champion Uali Kurzhev for the inaugural ONE Lightweight Submission Grappling World Championship at ONE on Prime Video 3. After Kurzhev failed hydration twice, a catchweight of 174 lbs was established, four pounds heavier than initially intended, making Kurzhev ineligible for the belt. Ruotolo submitted Kurzhev with a heel hook at the 4:26 mark of the 10-minute bout to win the title and become the first-ever ONE Lightweight Submission Grappling World Champion.

Ruotolo defended his title against Matheus Gabriel on December 3, 2022, at ONE on Prime Video 5. He won the match via unanimous decision.

Brazilian Jiu-Jitsu competitive summary 
Main Achievements:
 ONE Submission Grappling World Champion (ONE Fight Night 3) (One time; current)(1 Defense)
 ADCC Submission Fighting World Champion (2022)
 Who's Number One (WNO) Champion (2021)
 GrappleFest 70KG Belt Holder (2020)
 EBI Combat Jiu-Jitsu Champion (2020)
 3rd place 3QG Kumite 5 GP (2020)

Main Achievements (Kids + Juvenile):
 IBJJF World Champion (2019)
 IBJJF Pan Champion (2019)
 IBJJF European Open Champion (2019)
 IBJJF Pan Kids Champion (2010 / 2014 / 2015 / 2017 / 2018)
 IBJJF Kids International Champion (2014 / 2016)
 IBJJF Kids American Nationals Champion (2014 / 2015)
 2nd place IBJJF European Open (2019)
 3rd place IBJJF Pan Championship (2019)

Awards
 Jitsmagazine BJJ Awards 'Submission of the Year'  vs. Joshua Dawson at ADCC North American East Coast Trials  (2021)
 Jitsmagazine BJJ Awards 'Submission of the Year'  vs. PJ Barch at Combat Jiu-Jitsu Lightweight World Championships (2020)

Instructor lineage 
Mitsuyo "Count Koma" Maeda → Carlos Gracie, Sr. → Helio Gracie → Rolls Gracie → Romero "Jacare" Cavalcanti → Alexandre Paiva → Fernando "Tererê" Augusto →  André Galvao → Kade Ruotolo

Notes

References 

Living people
2003 births
American practitioners of Brazilian jiu-jitsu
People awarded a black belt in Brazilian jiu-jitsu
People from Maui
American submission wrestlers
ADCC Submission Fighting World Champions (men)
ONE Championship champions